Peter German (born 2 February 1965) is a former Australian rules footballer. Since retiring he has become a successful coach. German coached Subiaco to the 2004 and 2006 WAFL premierships and was rewarded by being named as an assistant to Chris Connolly at Fremantle. Peter has coached second-tier Australian rules in three different states and been involved with five different Australian rules football clubs in a coaching and player capacity. 

Peter played 185 games for 201 goals for North Melbourne in the AFL. Used primarily as a midfielder over a 10 year career with one club. 

His first coaching assignment was with Burnie in 1995 before he moved into the AFL. He was an assistant coach at Hawthorn and West Coast.

From 2003-2006 German coached Subiaco in the WAFL taking them to two premierships one in 2004 the other in 2006. 

During his time in the WAFL, he coached the West Australian state side v South Australia in 2006. 

He went on to be an assistant coach at the Fremantle Football Club in 2007 and 2008 before departing for a life back in Melbourne with his family. 

In 2009 German was appointed the senior coach job of the Casey Scorpions in the VFL. He was named VFL coach of the year despite leading them to 6th place on the ladder. Casey Scorpions lost in the opening week of the finals. 

From 2010 until 2013, German was a development coach for the Western Bulldogs in the AFL, and senior coach of its VFL-affiliate Williamstown. With German as coach, Williamstown won the inaugural Foxtel Cup in 2011.

German was appointed as coach of Ovens and Murray Football League team Albury Tigers for 2019, however departed via mutual consent only four games into the season.

German now works for AFL Cairns as General Manager for the North Cairns Tigers, overseeing the clubs Football Operations and Coaching. After just one season largely disrupted due to the COVID-19 pandemic, it was announced German would make a shock return to the Ovens and Murray Football League with Corowa-Rutherglen.

German is a life member of the North Melbourne Football Club and the Victorian Football League.

In Sep 2022, it was announced German would become head coach of the Perth Demons (in the WAFL)

References

External links

1965 births
Living people
Australian rules footballers from Victoria (Australia)
North Melbourne Football Club players
Subiaco Football Club coaches
Burnie Dockers Football Club players
Casey Demons coaches
Williamstown Football Club coaches
Victorian State of Origin players
Peel Thunder Football Club coaches
Peel Thunder Football Club players